Edward Joseph Flynn (September 22, 1891 – August 18, 1953) was an American lawyer and politician.  Flynn was a leading Democratic politician of the mid-twentieth-century, known for his tight control of the Bronx Democratic Party organization after 1922, and his close association with President Franklin D. Roosevelt after 1932.

Life
Flynn was the youngest son of Henry T. Flynn and Sarah Mallon Flynn. He was born on September 22, 1891, in the Bronx, then New York County, now Bronx County, New York City. He graduated from Fordham Law School in 1912, was admitted to the bar in June 1913, and practiced in the Bronx. On June 15, 1927, he married Helen Margaret Jones.

He entered politics as a Democrat; and was a member of the New York State Assembly (Bronx Co., 2nd D.) in 1918, 1919, 1920 and 1921.

He was sheriff of Bronx County, New York, (1922–1925), chamberlain of the City of New York (1926–1928), chairman of the Executive Committee of the Bronx County Democratic Committee (1922–1953), secretary of state of New York state (1929–1939), Democratic national committeeman from New York (1930–1953), and chairman of the Democratic National Committee (1940–1943).  He was also the United States commissioner general on the New York World's Fair Commission (1939-1940).

He was a close associate of President Franklin D. Roosevelt for many years. Along with James Farley he was the president's chief advisor of patronage. He helped Roosevelt through all of his elections, but repeatedly refused offers of jobs in the Roosevelt administration. He did accompany Roosevelt to the Yalta Conference remaining in Europe afterwards to carry out various missions for the president. His mission was to open a diplomatic relationship between the Kremlin and the Papacy. The President believed that peace could only be obtained in Eastern Europe if there was large Catholic presence. After his mission, Flynn traveled to England to meet with Prime Minister Winston Churchill. His work in England was cut short by Roosevelt's death; this death marked the end of Flynn's mission in Europe. In 1947, Flynn published You're the Boss, a memoir of his experiences in politics.

Flynn was one of the key figures in electing Harry S. Truman to each term of his presidency. His support in 1944 was crucial to Truman's selection as the vice presidential nominee of the Democratic Party, and thus his subsequently becoming president upon Roosevelt's death. Flynn was also one of the driving forces behind Truman's 1948 election victory.

Flynn died on August 18, 1953, in Dublin while on a visit to Ireland. His papers were given by his family to the Franklin D. Roosevelt Presidential Library and Museum, to be made available for the general public.

Legacy
The phrase "in like Flynn" has sometimes been claimed to be a reference to Flynn, though its folk etymology more frequently associates it with actor Errol Flynn. Etymologist Eric Partridge presents evidence that candidates Flynn backed were almost automatically "in", citing usage during Flynn's life that refers to him.

His son Richard Flynn became chairman of the Power Authority under Mario Cuomo.

References

Further reading
 Flynn, Edward J. You're the boss (1947); autobiography. online
 MacKay, Malcolm.  In With Flynn, The Boss Behind the President (2020), popular biography. excerpt

External links
Biography at the FDR Library
Short biographical entry from The Columbia Encyclopedia, 6th edition, at Encyclopedia.com (giving wrong birth year), also available from Bartleby.com
 (obituary)
 

|-

|-

1891 births
1953 deaths
20th-century American politicians
Democratic National Committee chairs
Democratic Party members of the New York State Assembly
Politicians from the Bronx
Secretaries of State of New York (state)
Sheriffs of Bronx County, New York